"Drive Me to Paris" is a song performed by Belgian singer-songwriter Tom Dice, released as the third single from his second studio album Heart for Sale (2012). It was released on 22 October 2012 as a digital download in Belgium on iTunes. The song was written by Jeroen Swinnen, Tom Dice and Ashley Hicklin.

Music video
A music video to accompany the release of "Drive Me to Paris" was first released onto YouTube on 15 October 2012 at a total length of three minutes and fifty-six seconds.

Track listing

Credits and personnel
 Lead vocals – Tom Dice
 Record producers – Jeroen Swinnen
 Lyrics – Jeroen Swinnen, Tom Dice, Ashley Hicklin
 Label: Universal Music Belgium

Chart performance

Release history

References

2012 singles
Tom Dice songs
Songs written by Ashley Hicklin
Songs written by Tom Dice
Songs written by Jeroen Swinnen
Universal Music Group singles